"Southtown" is the debut single by the Christian metal band P.O.D. It was released in February 2000 from the band's major label debut album, The Fundamental Elements of Southtown. An earlier version of the song originally appeared on The Warriors EP.

Music video
The song's music video was directed by Marcos Siega and photographed by cinematographer Steve Gainer ASC ASK. It features the band performing amongst a crowd.

Track listing
US promo single

German promo single

Chart and sales

Covers 
The song was covered by American metalcore band the Ghost Inside for the 2014 cover compilation album Punk Goes 90s Vol. 2.

References

2000 debut singles
P.O.D. songs
Music videos directed by Marcos Siega
1999 songs
Song recordings produced by Howard Benson
Songs written by Noah Bernardo
Songs written by Marcos Curiel
Songs written by Traa Daniels
Songs written by Sonny Sandoval